The Justice Select Committee of the United Kingdom is a select committee of the House of Commons which scrutinizes the policy, administration, and spending of the Ministry of Justice. In addition, the committee examines the work of the Law Officers of the Crown, the Serious Fraud Office, and the Crown Prosecution Service. The committee also reviews draft Sentencing Guidelines issued by the Sentencing Guidelines Council.

The committee scrutinises the work of the Secretary of State for Justice, Attorney General, Solicitor General and the Minister of State for Prisons among others.

Membership 
In the 58th Parliament, the committee has the following members:

Changes since 2019

2017–2019 Parliament
The chair was elected on 12 July 2017, with the members of the committee being announced on 11 September 2017.

Changes 2017–2019

2015–2017 Parliament
The chair was elected on 18 June 2015, with members being announced on 6 July 2015.

Changes 2015–2017

2010–2015 Parliament
The chair was elected on 10 June 2010, with members being announced on 12 July 2010.

Changes 2010–2015

See also 
 Parliamentary Committees of the United Kingdom

References

External links 
 Official website
 Records for this Committee are held at the Parliamentary Archives

Select Committees of the British House of Commons
Parliamentary committees on Justice